Zeeland is a village in the Dutch province of North Brabant. It is located in the former municipality of Landerd, about 5 km northeast of Uden.

History 
The village was first mentioned in 1376 as Zeelant, and refers to Terra Salica, an inheritance system which excluded women. Zeeland developed in the Middle Ages on the edge of the Peel region. The Catholic St Jacobus de Meerdere Church was built between 1871 and 1872 as a replacement for its medieval predecessor.

Zeeland was home to 467 people in 1840. Zeeland was a separate municipality until 1994, when it became part of Landerd. Since 2022 it has been part of the new municipality of Maashorst.

Gallery

References

External links
 

Populated places in North Brabant
Former municipalities of North Brabant
Municipalities of the Netherlands disestablished in 1994
Geography of Maashorst